Charlesville can mean:
Canada 
 Charlesville, Nova Scotia
United States
 Charlesville, Maryland
 Charlesville, Minnesota
 Charlesville, Pennsylvania
Africa
 a district within Kopanong Local Municipality, South Africa
 Djokupunda, a small town in the Kasai-Occidental province of the Democratic Republic of the Congo, known in colonial times as Charlesville

See also
 Charleville (disambiguation)